Brajše is a village in the municipality of Ulcinj, Montenegro. It is located north-east of Ulcinj town.

Demographics

According to Montenegro's 2011 census, Brajše has a population of 682 of which 344 are men (50.4%) and 338 are women (49.6%). A significant portion of the population (559, or 82.0%) is over the age of 15.

Ethnic Demographics 
According to Montenegro's 2011 census, all residents of Brajše are ethnically Albanian and nearly all residents (99.9%) consider Albanian to be their mother tongue. Additionally, 681 (99.9%) of the residents practice Islam.

References

Populated places in Ulcinj Municipality
Albanian communities in Montenegro